Coprinopsis pseudoradiata is a species of coprophilous fungus in the family Psathyrellaceae. It grows on the dung of sheep.

See also
List of Coprinopsis species

References

Fungi described in 2001
Fungi of Europe
pseudoradiata